The Libya national football team has participated in three Africa Cup of Nations competitions in its history: 1982, 2006, and 2012.

Libya is an infrequent AFCON participant as it is one of the weaker sides in Africa, coming from the strong North African region that includes the national teams of Morocco, Egypt, Tunisia, and Algeria. Therefore, in spite of being a member of one of the stronger African federations, UNAF, Libya's accomplishments are limited compared to its neighbors. Nevertheless, Libya still has had some success at AFCON: as host of 1982 edition, Libya almost won the tournament but fell to Ghana in a penalty shoot-out. In the 2006 and 2012 tournaments, Libya exited both in the group stage.

Libya has been seeded in Group A in all three of its AFCON appearances.

Africa Cup of Nations Record

List of matches

Libya 1982

Group A

Knockout stage

Egypt 2006

Group A

Equatorial Guinea/Gabon 2012

Group A

Notes

References

External links
Africa Cup of Nations - Archives competitions - cafonline.com

Libya national football team
Countries at the Africa Cup of Nations